Bao Muhammad Rizwan Rehamani is a Pakistani politician who was the Provincial Minister of Punjab for Environment Protection, in office from February 2019 till April 2022. He had been a Member of the Provincial Assembly of the Punjab from August 2018 till January 2023.

Political career

He was elected to the Provincial Assembly of the Punjab as a candidate of Pakistan Muslim League (Q) (PML(Q)) from PP-41 (Sialkot-VII) in 2018 Pakistani general election.

On 9 February 2019, he was appointed as Provincial Minister of Punjab for Environment Protection in the cabinet of Chief Minister Usman Buzdar.

On 21 February 2023, after the dissolution of the Provincial Assembly, Rizwam, along with former Chief Minister Chaudhry Pervaiz Elahi and eight other former PML(Q) MPAs, joined the Pakistan Tehreek-e-Insaf (PTI).

References

Living people
Punjab MPAs 2018–2023
Pakistan Muslim League (Q) MPAs (Punjab)
Year of birth missing (living people)